The fourth season of the ABC American television drama series How to Get Away with Murder was ordered on February 10, 2017, by ABC. It began airing on September 28, 2017, with 15 episodes like the previous seasons and concluded on March 15, 2018, as per a deal with Viola Davis that the series would be a limited series with only 15 or 16 episodes per season.

Plot
Annalise (Viola Davis) and the Keating Four are still dealing with the aftermath of Wes's (Alfred Enoch) death. Annalise works with a therapist, Dr. Isaac Roa, to see through her recovery from alcoholism, and cuts ties with her associates. Connor (Jack Falahee) declines Oliver's (Conrad Ricamora) proposal, Laurel (Karla Souza) expects Wes's baby, Michaela (Aja Naomi King) and Asher (Matt McGorry) team up for internships, and Bonnie (Liza Weil) seeks her professional future. Laurel deduces that her father, Jorge Castillo (Esai Morales), is responsible for Wes's murder and hatches a scheme to steal incriminating evidence with Michaela, Oliver, and a reluctant Frank and Asher. During the data heist, classmate Simon Drake (Behzad Dabu) accidentally shoots himself with Laurel's gun, leading to Asher's arrest, and Laurel goes into premature labor after being accidentally struck by Frank. Though Annalise successfully saves the baby, Jorge takes custody of the child while Laurel is in the  hospital.

Cast and characters

Main
 Viola Davis as Annalise Keating
 Billy Brown as Nate Lahey
 Jack Falahee as Connor Walsh
 Aja Naomi King as Michaela Pratt
 Matt McGorry as Asher Millstone
 Conrad Ricamora as Oliver Hampton
 Karla Souza as Laurel Castillo
 Charlie Weber as Frank Delfino
 Liza Weil as Bonnie Winterbottom

Recurring
 Jimmy Smits as Isaac Roa
 Esai Morales as Jorge Castillo
 Benito Martinez as Todd Denver
 Behzad Dabu as Simon Drake
 Amirah Vann as Tegan Price
 Nicholas Gonzalez as Dominic
 Lolita Davidovich as Sandrine Castillo
 John Hensley as Ronald Miller
 Glynn Turman as Nate Lahey Sr.

Special guest
 Kerry Washington as Olivia Pope

Guest
 Cicely Tyson as Ophelia Harkness
 Roger Robinson as Mac Harkness
 Gwendolyn Mulamba as Celestine Harkness
 Julius Tennon as Desmond
 Stephanie Faracy as Ellen Freeman
 L. Scott Caldwell as Jasmine Bromelle
 Marianne Jean-Baptiste as Virginia Cross
 Cristine Rose as Wenona Sansbury
 D. W. Moffett as Jeff Walsh
 Jim Abele as Ted Walsh
 Luna Vélez as Soraya Hargrove
 Kathryn Erbe as Jacqueline Roa
 Oded Fehr as Chase
 Alfred Enoch as Wes Gibbins
 Cornelius Smith Jr. as Marcus Walker
 Tom Irwin as Spivey
 Sharon Lawrence as Ingrid Egan
 Yolonda Ross as Claudia
 Tom Verica as Sam Keating
 Melinda Page Hamilton as Claire Telesco
 Rome Flynn as Gabriel Maddox

Episodes

Production

Development
How to Get Away with Murder was renewed for a fourth season on February 10, 2017, by ABC. Production began on May 8, 2017, when one of the writers of the show announced on Twitter that the writing staff was in full swing mapping and writing the fourth season. The table read occurred on July 14, 2017. Showrunner Peter Nowalk revealed the title of the season 4 premiere: "I'm Going Away".

Casting
The cast features nine major roles receiving star billing, all of them returning from the previous season. Viola Davis portrays the protagonist of the series, Professor Annalise Keating, a high-profile defense attorney. Billy Brown portrays Detective Nate Lahey, Annalise's boyfriend. There are four students who work at Annalise's law firm. Jack Falahee portrays Connor Walsh, a ruthless student. Aja Naomi King plays Michaela Pratt, an ambitious student who aims to be as successful as Annalise. Matt McGorry continues portraying Asher Millstone, a student from a privileged background. Karla Souza portrays Laurel Castillo, an idealistic student. Charlie Weber plays Frank Delfino, an employee of Annalise's firm who is not a lawyer but handles special duties requiring discretion. Liza Weil plays Bonnie Winterbottom, who is an associate attorney in Annalise's firm. Conrad Ricamora portrays Oliver Hampton, a hacker who is in a relationship with Connor.

In July 2017, Jimmy Smits was cast in an unspecified role. He plays Dr. Isaac Roa, Annalise's court-requested therapist. In August, Davis' husband, Julius Tennon, was confirmed to guest star. He plays Desmond, a man who flirts with Annalise during a flight. In September 2017, Natalie Abrams of EW.com revealed that D. W. Moffett was cast as Connor's father. In January 2018, it was announced that Lolita Davidovich would recur in the second half of the season. She plays the role of Sandrine Castillo, Laurel's mother.

Scandal crossover
On January 3, 2018, Scandal star Kerry Washington tweeted a photo to Viola Davis of herself in a "familiar" setting, that being a courthouse used for the set of How to Get Away with Murder. Fans began to speculate a possible crossover episode being in the works, which was only heightened when Davis tweeted out a photo in response, that being her on the set of Mellie Grant's (Bellamy Young) Oval Office. Later that day, the crossover was officially confirmed through a tweet by Scandal creator Shonda Rhimes.

How to Get Away with Murder creator Peter Nowalk later went on to share in an interview with Deadline:

Reception

Critical response
The review aggregator website Rotten Tomatoes gave the season a 100% approval rating, with an average rating of 7.9/10 based on 8 reviews. Maureen Lee Lenker of EW gave the premiere a B letter rating. Kayla Kumari Upadhyaya, writing for The A.V. Club, rated the premiere a A−, commenting, "It's a strange but ultimately satisfying premiere, standing out from the show's past premieres by going the slow character drama route rather than murder party." Ali Barthwell of Vulture rated the premiere a 4 out of 5 stars, glorifying Viola Davis' performance. Meghan De Maria of Refinery29 also praised Davis' acting, naming it the "glue that holds the series together".

Ratings

References

External links

 
 

2017 American television seasons
2018 American television seasons
Season 4